Lanny E. Fite (born c. 1950) is a retired county judge for Saline County, Arkansas, who is a Republican member of the Arkansas House of Representatives for District 23.

In 2014, he was elected without opposition to succeed the term-limited Ann Clemmer, a fellow Republican who instead ran unsuccessfully for the United States House of Representatives for Arkansas's 2nd congressional district. In his first term in office, Fite
serves on the House committees of (1) Revenue and Tax Committee, (2) State Agencies and Governmental Affairs Committee, and (3) the Legislative Council.

Fite graduated from Benton High School in Benton, the seat of government of Saline County. He is a member of Lions International and the Baptist Church. In 2011, he received the Professional of the Year Award from the University of Arkansas at Little Rock. In 2001, he was the "Benton Citizen of the Year." He formerly lived in North Little Rock, Cabot, and Lonoke, Arkansas.

References

1949 births
Living people
Benton High School (Arkansas) alumni
Republican Party members of the Arkansas House of Representatives
County judges in Arkansas
People from Benton, Arkansas
Baptists from Arkansas
21st-century American politicians